Texas divisionism is a mainly historical movement that advocates the division of the U.S. state of Texas into as many as five states, as some considered to be statutorily permitted by a provision included in the resolution admitting the former Republic of Texas into the Union in 1845.

Texas divisionists argue that the division of their state could be desirable because, as the second-largest state in the United States in both area and population, Texas is too large to be governed efficiently as one political unit or that in several states, Texans would gain more power at the federal level, particularly in the U.S. Senate since each state elects two senators, and by extension in the Electoral College in which each state gets two electoral votes for their senators in addition to an electoral vote for each representative. However, others argue that division may be wastefully duplicative by requiring a new state government for each new state.

Federal constitutional process
Article IV, Section 3, of the United States Constitution expressly prohibits any other state from dividing up and forming smaller states without congressional approval. The relevant section states "New states may be admitted by the Congress into this union; but no new states shall be formed or erected within the jurisdiction of any other state; nor any state be formed by the junction of two or more states, or parts of states, without the consent of the legislatures of the states concerned as well as of the Congress."

The Joint Resolution for Annexing Texas to the United States, approved by Congress on March 1, 1845, states:

Proponents of the right of Texas to divide itself to create new states without congressional approval argue that the resolution of 1845, a bill which passed both houses of Congress, stands as congressional "pre-approval" under the terms of the Constitution for formation of such new states. That interpretation of the statute is disputed by opponents. 

Opponents argue that there was no such "pre-approval" granted to Texas by Congress within the statute and that the Constitution requires future congressional approval of any new states that are proposed to be formed from what is now the state of Texas. According to opponents, the statute does not grant Texas any congressional "pre-approval" for partition, but the statute simply limits the number of new states that could be carved out of the annexed Texas territory to four. 

Opponents also argue that the statute has also been overridden and rendered moot by later legislation that was enacted by Congress, the Act which admitted Texas into the Union as a state. The text of the subsequent Texas Admission Act, signed on 29 December 1845, states that Texas would be admitted to the Union "on an equal footing with the original States in all respects whatever," which moots any supposed special right for Texas to divide itself up into five states without the future approval of Congress in accordance to Article V, Section 3, of the US Constitution.

Legislative efforts 
The division of the state of Texas was frequently proposed in the early decades of Texan statehood, particularly in the decades immediately prior to and following the American Civil War.

Compromise of 1850 debates 

In the Compromise of 1850 debates, Tennessee Senator John Bell proposed division into two southern states, with the assent of Texas, in February 1850. New Mexico would get all Texas land north of the 34th parallel north, including today's Texas Panhandle, while the area to the south, including the southeastern part of today's New Mexico, would be divided at the Colorado River of Texas into two Southern states, balancing the admission of California and New Mexico as free states.

State of Lincoln 
The State of Lincoln was proposed in 1869, to be carved out of the territory of Texas from the area south and west of the state's Colorado River. Unlike many other Texas division proposals of the Reconstruction period, this one was presented to Congress, but the state legislature did not take final action.

State of Jefferson 
A bill was introduced in the Texas legislature in 1915 to create a State of Jefferson, made up of the Texas Panhandle.

Texlahoma
In 1935, in response to what proponents felt was lack of state attention to road infrastructure, A. P. Sights proposed that 46 northern Texas counties and 23 western Oklahoma counties secede to form a new, roughly rectangular state called Texlahoma.

Considerations
In 2009, Nate Silver wrote an article covering the topic of dividing Texas. He argued that a division could slightly help Republicans in the Senate while slightly hurting them in the Electoral College, ultimately concluding that there was not much rationale for either political party to support such a division.

In a 2019 Yale lecture series called "Power and Politics in Today's World", Professor Ian Shapiro argues that splitting Texas, and California, in two will be one effective way of solving the disproportionate influence of the two biggest states in the electoral college to facilitate a more proportional state-wide representation.

See also 
 Partition and secession in California

References

External links
 Snopes.com entry on the history of the proposal
 "Messing with Texas," a post on the FiveThirtyEight blog on the political implications of a hypothetical modern-day division of Texas
 "Not to rain on the parade, since it is a fun mapping/naming exercise, but any state can partition itself the way Texas can..."

History of Texas
Politics of Texas
Texas
Republic of Texas